Gamochaeta simplicicaulis, the simple-stem cudweed  or simple-stem everlasting, is a species of flowering plant in the sunflower family. It is native to South America and has become naturalized in Australia, New Zealand, and the southeastern United States (from Alabama to Virginia).

The plant forms many small flower heads in elongated arrays and also in tightly packed clumps. Each head contains 2–3 yellow disc flowers but no ray flowers.

References

simplicicaulis
Flora of South America
Plants described in 1826
Taxa named by Ángel Lulio Cabrera